Reci is a commune in Covasna County, Transylvania, Romania composed of four villages:
Aninoasa / Egerpatak
Bita / Bita
Reci
Saciova / Szacsva

It also included Comolău (Komolló) village until 1968, when it was disestablished.

History 
A Roman settlement was discovered near Reci, from the 4th century, belonging to the Sântana de Mureș culture.
A settlement and a grave from the 10th-11th centuries were discovered on the right bank of the Negru River.
Until 1918, the village belonged to the Háromszék County of the Austro-Hungary. After the Treaty of Trianon of 1920, it became part of Romania.

Demographics

The commune has an absolute Székely Hungarian majority. According to the 2002 Census it has a population of 2,234 of which 98.88% or 2,209 are Hungarian.

Twin towns
: Abony

References

Communes in Covasna County
Localities in Transylvania